The 1893 Mid Tipperary by-election was a parliamentary by-election held for the United Kingdom House of Commons constituency of Mid Tipperary on 24 February 1893. The vacancy arose because of the death of the sitting member, John McCarthy of the Irish National Federation. Only one candidate was nominated, James Francis Hogan of the Irish National Federation, who was elected unopposed.

Result

References

1893 elections in the United Kingdom
February 1893 events
By-elections to the Parliament of the United Kingdom in County Tipperary constituencies
Unopposed ministerial by-elections to the Parliament of the United Kingdom in Irish constituencies
1893 elections in Ireland